Thomas Pratt (10 October 1905 – 24 August 1992) was an Australian rules footballer who played with Fitzroy in the Victorian Football League (VFL).

Family
The son of Charlotte Barbara Bicknell and an unknown father, Thomas Bicknell was born at Prahran on 10 October 1905. When his mother married Arthur Vaughan Pratt in 1911, Bicknell took the family name Pratt.

War service
Pratt later served in the Australian Army during World War II.

Notes

External links 
		

1905 births
1992 deaths
Australian rules footballers from Melbourne
Fitzroy Football Club players
People from Prahran, Victoria
Australian Army personnel of World War II
Military personnel from Melbourne